The tricable gondola lift, also known as the 3S gondola lift, is a cable car system that was developed by the Swiss company Von Roll transport systems in Thun to unite the benefits of a gondola lift with those of a reversible cable car system. '3S' is an abbreviation of the German word , meaning 'tricable'.

History
The first plant of this type, called Alpine Express I, was built in 1991 in Saas-Fee. In 1994, a further section, called Alpine Express II, became operational, although a continuous service of both sections is not possible. The cabins of these plants have space for 30 persons and travel with a speed of 6 m/s pulled by an endless hauling cable, and suspended from two carrying cables.

A lane thus consists of three cables, from which the system takes its name. As with most rotating cabin cableways, gondolas are detachable from the cables in order to allow easy disembarkation without disrupting the transit of other cabins on the system. The system offers the following advantages over less sophisticated aerial cable-driven transportation systems:
 lower energy consumption compared with reversible aerial ropeways and funitels of similar capacity
 high passenger capacity and comfort compared with conventional reversible cable car systems
 more frequent departures compared with conventional reversible cable car systems
 increased wind stability compared with conventional (monocable) gondola lifts
 larger ground distances and rope spans are possible compared with conventional gondola lifts
 high driving speed compared with conventional gondola lifts, as speeds over 8 m/s are possible 

Development and building of the Alpine Express I cost 70 million CHF. Von Roll built no more 3S cable cars after the two systems in Saas Fee. When Von Roll was acquired by the Austrian company, Doppelmayr, in 1996, Doppelmayr attained the know-how for 3S gondola lift construction. Doppelmayr constructed their first system in 2002, in Val-d'Isère, France.

Since then, the Italian company, Leitner, has also developed a 3S system, constructing their first system in 2009, in Ritten, Italy.

The Austrian company, Doppelmayr, has developed a tricable gondola carriage which generates electricity. The wheels that roll along the two support cables are attached to electricity generators. The electricity is used to power seat heating, lighting, and other electrical features inside the cabins.

Notable installations

Kitzbühel
The 3S cable car in Kitzbühel, Austria bridges the Saukasergraben and connects the skiing areas of Kirchberg and Resterhöhe with one another. The lift opened in January 2005 and is 3,642 metres long. A journey takes approximately nine minutes from end to end. At its highest point, the cableway is 400 metres from the ground. The use of only one aerial lift pylon resulted in an unusual span width of 2,507 metres between the valley station and the 80-metre support pillar. Overall, the system cost 13.5 million euros with each cabin costing 100,000 euros.

The cableway was manufactured by Doppelmayr. The cable has a diameter of 54 millimetres. The electrical power consumption is 400 kW. There are 19 cabins in total, though the system can be expanded to 24 cabins if the need arises in the future. Each cabin seats 24 people, allowing the system to transport a total of 3,200 people in any given hour. One cabin has a glass floor, making it possible to view the 400 metre drop from a different angle.

Peak 2 Peak Gondola

In December 2008, Whistler-Blackcomb ski resort in British Columbia became the first North American resort to install a 3S lift when it opened the Peak 2 Peak Gondola, which connects Roundhouse Lodge on Whistler with Rendezvous Lodge on Blackcomb. The lift is similar to the Kitzbühel lift, as it connects two ski areas (although in this case, more two parts of the same area together). The installation of the Peak 2 Peak Gondola eliminated the need to use the base area gondolas to get between Whistler and Blackcomb, connecting the areas together.

Sochi
The Olympic Village lift in Sochi, Russia, was built in 2012 by Doppelmayr. The lift has hangers designed to transport road vehicles, in addition to the regular passenger cabins.

Hòn Thơm
In February 2018, the Hòn Thơm lift, in Vietnam, became the longest passenger ropeway in the world, at 7.9 km long. The lift travels over several of the Phú Quốc islands, in the Gulf of Thailand. The system was manufactured by Doppelmayr.

Matterhorn Glacier Ride
In September 2018, the Matterhorn Glacier Ride opened in Zermatt, running parallel to the existing cable car up to the Klein Matterhorn. The top station is located at 3821 metres above mean sea level, making it the highest altitude tricable gondola lift in the world. A second tricable gondola lift up to the Klein Matterhorn is currently under construction. Both systems are manufactured by Leitner.

References

External links
 
 Doppelmayr 3S Gondola Lifts

Aerial lifts